Vid Pečjak (7 January 1929 – 27 February 2016) was a Slovene author and psychologist.

Pečjak was born in Ljubljana, Slovenia. He has written 90 books, two thirds from the field of psychology. Most of his literary works are science fiction stories, novels, novelettes and also travel diaries and comic strip. Some of his works were written under his pseudonym Div Kajčep (palindrome of his name).

Pečjak is perhaps best known for his SF novel for children and youth Drejček in trije marsovčki (Drejček and Three Little Martians) (1961), which concerns a little boy named Drejček (Andy) who meets three little Martians.

References 

1929 births
2016 deaths
Writers from Ljubljana
Slovenian science fiction writers
Yugoslav science fiction writers
Slovenian psychologists
Levstik Award laureates
People from Ljubljana in health professions